Hlynur Pálmason (born 30 September 1984) is an Icelandic film director and screenwriter. A native of Hornafjörður, Iceland, he studied film at the National Film School of Denmark. 

His debut feature film Winter Brothers (Vinterbrødre) debuted at the Locarno Film Festival in 2017, and went on to win the Bodil Award for Best Danish Film and the Robert Award for Best Danish Film, with Pálmason also winning the Robert Award for Best Director.

His second feature film, A White, White Day (Hvítur, Hvítur Dagur), was selected to screen in the International Critics' Week section at the 2019 Cannes Film Festival, and was selected as Iceland's submission for the Academy Award for Best International Feature Film at the 92nd Academy Awards in 2020.

He followed up in 2022 with Godland  (Vanskabte Land), which premiered at the 2022 Cannes Film Festival.

Filmography

References

External links
 Hlynur Pálmason at the Icelandic Film Centre
 

1984 births
Living people
Icelandic film directors
Icelandic screenwriters
Icelandic film producers